César Gemayel (b. 1898 Ain al Touffaha near Bikfaya, Ottoman Empire; died in Beirut, Lebanon in 1958) was a notable Lebanese painter, who helped to lay the foundations of a modern Lebanese art movement.

Life and career

Gemayel received his early art education from Khalil Saleeby in Beirut. 

Gemayel was a pre-eminently sensual artist. His themes - the female nude, glowing flowers, landscapes green and red, dances and "dabkés", the occasional epic evocation - are the product of his thirst for living expressed through painting.

Along with artists, Mustafa Farrukh (1901-1957), Omar Onsi (1901-1969), Saliba Douaihy (Saliba Duwaihi) (b. 1915), Youssef Howayek, Daoud Corm (1852-1930),  and Rachid Wehbi (Rachid Wahbah)(b. 1917), Gemayel is regarded as a pioneer, having laid the foundations for a modern art movement in Lebanon. These artists established originality and freedom of expression that had never before been seen in Lebanon.  

In 1943, Gemayel and Alexis Boutros founded the Lebanese Academy of Fine Arts, also known as ALBA.

The artist is portrayed on a Lebanese airmail stamp issued in 1974 in recognition of his contribution to the visual arts.

References

External links
Site dedicated to César Gemayel's life and work

1898 births
1958 deaths
20th-century Lebanese painters